YRT, or yrt, may refer to:

 York Region Transit, a public transit operator in York Region, Ontario, Canada
 Youghiogheny River Trail, a rail trail at McKeesport, Pennsylvania, United States
 YRT, the IATA code for Rankin Inlet Airport in Nunavut, Canada
 YRT, the National Rail code for Yorton railway station in Shropshire, UK

See also